Oban Lorne RFC is a Scottish rugby union club based in Oban, Argyll and Bute.

History

The club run a men and women's XV.

Sevens

The club run the Oban Sevens. The tournament began in 1974.

Honours

Men

 West Regional League Division 2
 Champions (1): 2015
 RBS National Bowl 
Champions (1): 2013

Women

 Women's Bowl
 Champions (1): 2018

Notable former players

Glasgow Warriors players

Scotland international players

References 

Scottish rugby union teams
Rugby union in Argyll and Bute